Bangon Na, Bayan! is a Philippine radio program anchored by Joel Reyes Zobel and aired over GMA Network Inc.'s flagship radio AM station, DZBB Super Radyo, with an online streaming on the station's Facebook page, every weekday afternoons. The program includes reports, commentaries, public service and listeners' participation to a social and/or political topic of the day.

Segments
Pasada ng mga Balita – sometimes known as "Bangon na, Bayan! News Bullets", a daily recap of the hottest and biggest news for the past 12 hours
Unang Sigwada ng mga Balita – featuring reports from the Super Radyo Reportorial Team
Bangon na, Bayan! Calendar of Events – a quick recap of events happened on the same date in the history of the world.
Boses ng Bayan Poll for the Day – featuring the hottest issue to be discussed in all throughout the broadcast of the show for the day.
Editoryal ng Bayan – featuring Joel Reyes Zobel's personal opinion about the issue for the day.

See also
GMA News and Public Affairs
Super Radyo DZBB

Philippine radio programs
1999 radio programme debuts
GMA Integrated News and Public Affairs shows